

Brand
 Then I Met You, a skincare brand launched by Charlotte Cho

Albums
 Then I Met You, a 2010 album by Vinnie Who.